Goodness is the debut studio album by the American rock band Goodness.

Track listing
All songs by Goodness, except for "Electricity, Electricity" written by Bob Dorough
Superwise - 4:06
Smoking - 4:19
Wicked Eye - 3:05
For Lover's Sake - 2:16
Goodbye - 3:01
Runaround - 3:07
Labor Day - 3:59
Eveready - 3:34
Viva le High - 4:11
Sincerely Yours - 3:53
Between You and I - 7:41
Electricity, Electricity - 3:21 (Bonus Track)

Personnel
Carrie Akre - guitar, vocals
Garth Reeves - guitar, vocals
Chris Friel - drums
Fiia McGann - bass, cello, vocals
Danny Newcomb - guitar, vocals

Additional personnel
Eric Akre - drums on tracks 4 and 9
Joshua Medaris - background vocals on "Viva le High"
John Goodmanson - bass on "For Lover's Sake", mixing, producer
Mike McCready (as Petster) - guitar on Electricity, Electricity
Krista Gaylor - photography
Dave Hawkes - photography
Rhonda Pelikan - cover design
Howie Weinberg - mastering
Charles Peterson - photography

External links
 Goodness at Allmusic
 Goodness at Discogs

1995 debut albums
Goodness (band) albums
Albums produced by John Goodmanson